The 2003 Parapan American Games, officially the II Pan American Games, were a major international multi-sport event for athletes with disabilities, celebrated in the tradition of the Parapan American Games as governed by the Americas Paralympic Committee in Mar del Plata, Argentina. Over 1,500 athletes from 28 countries competed in the games. The games served as a qualifier for the 2004 Summer Paralympics. For the second time, the Parapan American Games were held in the same year but at a different location than the Pan American Games; however, the games were initially supposed to be held in the Dominican Republic, but they were unable to host them. This was the last year that the two events would be held in different cities, as the 2007 Parapan American Games and 2007 Pan American Games were both held in Rio de Janeiro.

The Games

Venues 

Source: IPC

Sports

Medal table

See also 
2003 Pan American Games

References 

 
Parapan American Games
Parapan American Games
Parapan American Games, 2003
Parapan American Games
Parapan American Games
Parapan American Games, 2003